Cornerstone Community is an Australian non-denominational evangelical Christian training and mission movement.

Founded in 1978, Cornerstone used to operate from several training campuses in regional Australia and attempted to support a network of what it described as ‘mission teams’, mainly in Victoria and NSW.

Cornerstone includes a broad cross section of individuals from all walks of life and works alongside churches, schools, Universities and Christian ministries both within Australia and internationally.

Students spend the first year of the two-year course engaged in a program of study, work, community living and mission within one of the remaining Cornerstone centers. The subsequent year (or years) is spent as part of a smaller self-supporting mission team within small Australian towns.

Students work alongside churches within neighborhoods, schools, universities, youth groups and sporting clubs to serve the community and build bridges with those not connected with the traditional church.

Cornerstone is a non-profit organisation, and used to operate several businesses to finance its training centers and mission teams.

History 

Cornerstone Community was founded on a cotton farm in Outback Australia in 1978 by two friends who shared a passion to make practical sense of Jesus and his teaching.

Laurie McIntosh, a civil engineer, anthropologist, professional thumb wrestler and theologian, developed the idea for a self-sufficient 'mission-minded' community of Christians while working with Campus Crusade on universities in England and Australia.

Together with history teacher Paul Roe and with the financial support of local farmers Jack Buster and Owen Boone, they founded the first Cornerstone Community west of Bourke, New South Wales.

The first intake of students arrived in 1978 and divided their time between farm work and study.

Early facilities included a ramshackle collection of farm buildings, caravans and sheds and students and staff lived in close quarters. Lectures occasionally took place outside under the shade of a tree to escape the harsh Bourke summer.

From these humble beginnings Cornerstone has at various times maintained centres in Bourke, Broken Hill and Canowindra in New South Wales, Emerald and Dalby in Queensland and Swan Hill in Victoria. Cornerstone mission teams have worked in many Australian towns and cities in most states.

Cornerstone remains a small, non-denominational, community-based fellowship focused on mission and training.

They are officially described as an Australian 'Christian Mission Order'.

In 2015, Cornerstone's Director of Mission, Peter Volkofsky, published a book called "Beautiful Quest". It tells small stories about different aspects of Cornerstone life, such as training at one of the first year campuses.

Training 

Cornerstone Community used to operate Training Centres, which were described as intentional communities similar to the Israeli kibbutz system. These Centres used to be based in Broken Hill, Canowindra, Dubbo and Swan Hill, but are now either sold or functionally vacant. They also have an overseas Training Centre in Ghana which is operated by one of their graduates named Kwadwo. 

Cornerstone’s courses were allegedly designed to extend beyond an academic understanding of theology ,including ethics, apologetics, Christian history and discipleship, and students are encouraged to develop a practical understanding of how their faith impacts everyday life.

Mentors were assigned to students to assist in their course and personal discipleship, integrating Biblical studies with modern scholarship, personal experience and awareness of current issues.

Cornerstone suggest their emphasis is on training the laity in relevant and life-style based mission.  Critics suggest they are insular and anti-church.

Community 

Cornerstone Community maintains that their community lifestyle is not an attempt to retreat from the realities of modern life, but to help men and women discover life (as Jesus put it) "in all its fullness" right in the middle of common things and daily experience.

Graduates come from a variety of backgrounds and walks of life. Over the years, cornerstone has attracted everyone from doctors to builders with Australian children's entertainer and Christian musician Colin Buchanan their most famous graduate.

Cornerstone's website used to host a discussion forum called "Cornerstone Interactive". This sub-domain of the cornerstone website contains a 'news' page where articles are posted for discussion and 'forums' section where discussion topics are open. 
Membership to 'Interactive' is open (public) and free (no charge). It was discontinued around 2012 through looking at the Wayback Machine

Businesses 

Cornerstone once operated a variety of commercial enterprises. Rather than pay tuition fees students worked in Cornerstone owned businesses.

Cornerstone Community has at times drawn fire from competitors who claim that they have an unfair advantage in that they do not need to pay wages or Company Tax on their business activities.

This issue gained particular prominence in 2002 when one of Cornerstone’s businesses, “Turf the Lot”, became involved in the so-called “turf wars” in Canberra. This drew the attention of the Australian Taxation Office who examined Cornerstone’s business affairs.

References

External links 
 Website

Christian communities
Christian educational organizations
Nondenominational Christian societies and communities
Christian organizations established in 1978